Kagera may refer to:
 Kagera Region in Tanzania
 Kagera River, originating in Burundi and flowing into Lake Victoria
 Kagera, Ukerewe, a ward in Ukerewe District, Tanzania
 Akagera National Park in Rwanda